Supreme Records was a record label subsidiary of Grey Gull Records of Boston, Massachusetts, from 1926 to 1929. A different Supreme Records label was started in 1947 by Al Patrick to issue race records. Its catalog included Jimmy Witherspoon, Fletcher Henderson, Jay McShann, and Buddy Tate. After a lawsuit against Decca, this label closed in 1950.

See also 
 List of record labels

Sources
 Allan Sutton: Directory of American Disc Record Brands and Manufacturers, 1891-1943 (Westport & London, 1994)

References

Defunct record labels of the United States
Jazz record labels